Orthion is a genus of flowering plants belonging to the family Violaceae.

Its native range is Southern Mexico to Colombia.

Species:

Orthion guatemalense 
Orthion malpighiifolium 
Orthion montanum 
Orthion oblanceolatum 
Orthion subsessile 
Orthion veracruzense

References

Violaceae
Malpighiales genera